The 1997 Laurie O'Reilly Cup was the fourth edition of the competition and was held on 16th August at Dunedin.
New Zealand retained the O'Reilly Cup after defeating Australia 40–0.

Match

References 

Laurie O'Reilly Cup
Australia women's national rugby union team
New Zealand women's national rugby union team
Laurie O'Reilly Cup
Sports competitions in Dunedin